Biman Banerjee (born 28 December 1948) is an Indian politician who has been Speaker of the West Bengal Legislative Assembly since May 30, 2011. Being a member of All India Trinamool Congress, he is a sitting member of West Bengal Legislative Assembly from Baruipur Paschim.

Life and career
Born and brought up in Garden Reach, Biman Banerjee graduated from the Goenka college and completed his master's degree in commerce and simultaneously in law from the University of Calcutta. His grandfather, Satish Chandra Banerjee, and his father, Pranotosh Banerjee, were reputed lawyers. He was employed in the Bank of India but subsequently left the job and joined the legal profession. He also served as a part-time lecturer in commercial & industrial law in Hari Mohan Ghosh College and was an examiner in the Calcutta University. He was elected as Councilor of Calcutta Municipal Corporation in 1985 from ward no. 136. He was also elected as a member of the West Bengal Bar Council.

Political career
In May 2011, the Trinamool MLA from Baruipur Paschim and practicing lawyer was elected as Speaker of the West Bengal Assembly unopposed, as the Opposition did not nominate a candidate for the post. After the election, he took a decision to give more importance to the sensitivities of the opposition and promised to give them more time to speak, on Chief Minister Mamata Banerjee's advice, a decision which was welcomed by the Leader of the Opposition, Suryakanta Mishra. After Biman Banerjee was elected, he was taken to the Speaker's Chair by Mishra, Prabodh Chandra Sinha and Subhas Naskar, where he engaged in the protocol of exchanging courtesies with the outgoing speaker, Hashim Abdul Halim.

References 

Living people
West Bengal MLAs 2011–2016
West Bengal MLAs 2016–2021
Trinamool Congress politicians from West Bengal
Speakers of the West Bengal Legislative Assembly
Goenka College of Commerce and Business Administration alumni
University of Calcutta alumni
Academic staff of the University of Calcutta
1948 births
Politicians from Kolkata